KGLX (99.1 FM) is a radio station broadcasting a country music format. Licensed to Gallup, New Mexico, United States. The station is currently owned by iHeartMedia, Inc.

References

External links
 

Country radio stations in the United States
GLX
Radio stations established in 1983
IHeartMedia radio stations